Torana Gate is a torana (a type of gateway) in Brickfields, Kuala Lumpur. The gate is a gift from the Government of India to Malaysia, as a mark of continued friendship between the two countries. It was influenced by Hindu and Buddhist architecture of the Indian subcontinent.

History
Indian Prime Minister Manmohan Singh announced the construction of the Torana Gate during a state visit to Malaysia in 2010. The Indian Ministry of External Affairs invited 16 firms for its design competition, and appointed architects Akshaya Jain & Associates to design the gate. The design is identical to the Great Stupa at Sanchi, Madhya Pradesh.

The gate was installed by developer MRCB Engineering Sdn Bhd on 20 August 2015. The Torana Gate was inaugurated on 23 November 2015 by Indian Prime Minister Narendra Modi and Malaysian Prime Minister Najib Razak.

Design

The reliefs on the Torana Gate, though broadly derived from the carvings at the Torana Gates of Sanchi, are yet different and intended to portray Indian art in a contemporary manner, adapted to suit the locational context. A large number of decorative elements have been used on the columns and architraves that include carved panels as well as sculpted blocks. The paved area around the Torana Gate, up to the piazza around the existing fountain, consists of patterned granite flooring. The pedestrian spine along the central axis is designed with a variety of geometrical motifs in varied shades of granite. The curvilinear ceiling of the Torana structure was designed with ribs running in both the directions. These structural ribs, creating 24 coffers, support carved stone panels, which are square in shape and have intricate floral carvings.

Gallery

See also

 India–Malaysia relations
 Torana

References

Buildings and structures in Kuala Lumpur
Monuments and memorials in Malaysia
Tourist attractions in Kuala Lumpur
India–Malaysia relations